Damas is a city in Dakahlia Governorate, Egypt.

See also
 List of cities and towns in Egypt

Populated places in Dakahlia Governorate